The 1984 United States Senate election in Wyoming took place on November 6, 1984. Incumbent Republican U.S. Senator Alan Simpson was re-elected to a second term in office, defeating Democrat Victor Ryan in a landslide.

Republican primary

Candidates
 Alan Simpson, incumbent Senator
 Stephen Tarver

Results

Democratic primary

Candidates
 Michael J. Dee, Republican candidate for U.S. Representative in 1982
 Al Hamburg, perennial candidate
 Victor Ryan, chemistry professor

Results

General election

Results

See also 
 1984 United States Senate elections

References

1984
Wyoming
United States Senate